Guilherme de Sá (born December 10, 1980) is a singer, songwriter, writer, poet, music producer and Brazilian arranger, best known for being the former vocalist of the Christian rock band Rosa de Saron from 2001 to 2019, having his last performance with the group on February 10, 2019 in São Paulo.

Biography

The musician joined the band in 2001 and made his debut on the album Depois do Inverno in 2002. Since the album Casa dos Espelhos, released in 2005, Sá was responsible for the albums' musical production of the albums. In addition, he was also the main composer in Rosa de Saron. His performances with the band won the Trophy Louvemos ao Senhor several times in the category better singer.

Starting in 2015, he started to perform as a solo artist alongside Mauro Henrique, lead singer of Oficina G3, and singer Leonardo Gonçalves. The three formed the project Loop Session + Friends, who performed in several theaters nationwide.

In 2017, Sá announced the release of his first solo album, titled Íngreme, distributed by the record company Som Livre. The single "Ágora" was released on digital platforms in February the same year.

On November 13, 2018, Guilherme de Sá announced his departure from Rosa de Saron through a video on the band's Facebook account.

On November 14, 2018, he released the single "A Última Canção" on digital platforms and the music video on YouTube.

In 2019 after the last show with Rosa de Saron, he moved to Florence, Italy, with his family. He currently lives with his family in York, England.

Discography

Rosa de Saron

Studio albums 
(2002) Depois do Inverno
(2005) Casa dos Espelhos
(2007) Acústico
(2009) Horizonte Distante
(2012) O Agora e o Eterno
(2014) Cartas ao Remetente
(2018) Gran Paradiso

Live albums 

 (2008) Acústico e ao Vivo
 (2010) Horizonte Vivo Distante
 (2013) Latitude, Longitude
 (2015) Acústico e ao Vivo 2/3

EPs 

 (2011) Siete Camiños

Compilation albums 

 (2016) Essencial: Rosa de Saron

Video albums 

 (2008) Acústico e ao Vivo
 (2010) Horizonte Vivo Distante
 (2012) Rosa na Estrada (documentary)
 (2013) Latitude, Longitude
 (2015) Acústico e ao Vivo 2/3
 (2016) Essencial: Rosa de Saron (compilation)

Solo 
(2017) Íngreme

References

1980 births
Living people
Musicians from São Paulo (state)
Brazilian Roman Catholic singers
Brazilian rock singers
21st-century Brazilian male singers
21st-century Brazilian singers